The University of Nebraska Omaha (Omaha or UNO) is a public research university in Omaha, Nebraska. Founded in 1908 by faculty from the Omaha Presbyterian Theological Seminary as a private non-sectarian college, the university was originally known as the University of Omaha. Originally meant to provide a Christian-based education free from ecclesiastical control, the university served as a strong alternative to the city's many successful religiously affiliated institutions.

Since the year 2000, the university has more than tripled its student housing and opened a 450-bed student dormitory and academic space on its Scott Campus in 2017. It has also recently constructed modern facilities for its engineering, information technology, business, and biomechanics programs. UNO currently offers more than 200 programs of study across 6 different colleges and has over 60 classroom, student, athletic, and research facilities spread across 3 campuses. It is classified among "R2: Doctoral Universities – High research activity".

The Omaha Mavericks compete in 15 NCAA Division I sports in both the NCHC and Summit League conferences. The ice hockey, basketball, and volleyball teams compete in Baxter Arena located on the university's Center Campus. Opened in 2021, the softball team competes at Connie Claussen Field and the baseball team plays at Tal Anderson Field, both located at Maverick Park, west of Baxter Arena. UNO enjoyed national attention in 2015, when its men's hockey team reached the national semifinal (Frozen Four) of the NCAA tournament for the first time.

History

Origin
The original Omaha University was founded in 1908 in the Kountze Place neighborhood of North Omaha. The first classes were located in the Redick Mansion, once at North 24th and Pratt Streets, from 1909 through 1917. As the university was established a few blocks north of the Presbyterian Theological Seminary, most of its early faculty were recruited from Seminary teachers, as well as the faculty of what was then known as Bellevue College. There were 26 students in the first year, most of whom had graduated from Omaha Central High School. Three of the university's first four presidents were ordained Presbyterian ministers. Two other buildings on the original campus included Jacobs Hall, a gymnasium erected in 1910, and Joslyn Hall, a classroom building erected in 1917.

Jacobs Hall was a gymnasium facing North 24th Street, built with $14,000 from the sale of land donated by Lillian Maul. The land, the first donation to the university, was near the present West Dodge campus of the university. It was the first new building constructed on the university campus. Joslyn Hall was built with funds donated by a well-known resident, George A. Joslyn. Donating $25,000 toward the building, he stipulated the school match that with another $25,000 in a year. The building was located just north of Redick Hall and was finished in January 1917. Joslyn Hall had three stories and a basement, with a total of thirty classrooms that accommodated 750 students. The building included chemistry and physics laboratories, an auditorium and music department. Redick Hall was sold and moved in February 1917 to Minnesota, where it was adapted for use in a resort.

In the early 1920s a proposed "magnificent campus" was slated for development between 21st and 25th Avenues, bounded by Kountze Park and the Carter Lake Park. In 1927, businessmen formed the North Omaha Activities Association in order to redevelop Saratoga School's playing field into a football field for the university's football team. With new bleachers built to accommodate a crowd of one thousand, the Saratoga Field was home to OU's football team until 1951. The school also served as OU's science call from 1917 to 1926.

Change to public university status
The university became a public municipal institution in 1930, and it moved from the North Omaha campus to its present main location at 60th and Dodge Street in 1938. The old campus buildings were redeveloped for a time as apartments and offices. In June 1964 Jacobs and Joslyn halls were the last two original OU buildings at 24th & Pratt Streets to be demolished. They were taken down in the early 1960s to make way for a 12-story Omaha Housing Authority apartment building for the elderly, which was completed in 1965.

Dr. Milo Bail became president of Omaha University in 1948 and served until 1965. During that time, Omaha hotel magnate Eugene C. Eppley's foundation gave more than $1.2 million to the university. After Eppley's death, the Eppley Foundation donated another $50,000 to recruit distinguished professors. The Eugene C. Eppley Administration Building, designed by John Latenser, Sr., at the university was named in recognition of the gifts. In 1952 the national Silver Wings student organization was founded at the University of Omaha. In 1976 the Dr. C.C. and Mabel L. Criss Library replaced the Eppley Library.

The university was integrated into the University of Nebraska system in 1968.

Academics

UNO is classified among "R2: Doctoral Universities – High research activity." UNO is the home of the Peter Kiewit Institute a $70 million computer science facility and engineering facility. PKI houses UNO's College of Information Science and Technology, UNL's College of Engineering and Technology, and the Holland Computing Center, which houses the Firefly supercomputer. The College of Information Science and Technology offers undergraduate/graduate degrees in Computer Science, Management Information Systems, Bioinformatics (graduate degree offered in collaboration with UNMC's Pathology's graduate program), Information Assurance, and Information Technology Innovation. In 2002, UNO became the first university in Nebraska to offer an ABET accredited computer science degree and the only university in the state with an ABET accredited information systems program.

The UNO College of Public Affairs and Community Service (CPACS) comprises 8 units and several subunits. The programs are interdisciplinary and work with countless local, national, and international organizations to make a difference in communities in Nebraska and around the world. As the state's highest-ranked college, it has eight programs ranked in the top 25 in the nation by U.S. News & World Report for 2023. These include #23 (tie) Best Public Affairs Program, #7 (tie) Local Government Management, #11 Nonprofit Management, #5 Public Finance, and #19 Public Management. Within the many programs offered by CPACS, rankings remain high for the college's popular School of Criminology and Criminal Justice graduate program, ranked 13th nationally. (U.S. News & World Report kept the rankings the same for all criminology programs this year.)   The College of Business Administration's Master of Business Administration students ranked in the top 5% nationally, while the undergraduate students ranked in the top 15% on a 2007 standardized exam on business topics conducted by the Educational Testing Service. The College of Business has continuously held accreditation from the Association to Advance Collegiate Schools of Business (AACSB) since 1965.  In 2013 the Department of Accounting was granted separate AACSB accreditation for its undergraduate and graduate programs. In 2014 the college opened the Jack & Stephanie Koraleski Commerce and Applied Behavioral Laboratory (CAB LAB).  The lab is used by researchers in the college and across the university to conduct a range of research for businesses and governmental entities across the country.

UNO's College of Public Affairs and Community Service is home to the Goodrich Scholarship Program, a prestigious program that provides full-tuition scholarships, counseling services, and a rigorous curriculum to high achieving Nebraska residents.

UNO maintains a widely regarded online film journal called the Journal of Religion and Film.

Campus

The University of Nebraska  Omaha is located in midtown Omaha, with a campus separated in three by Elmwood Park and Aksarben Village (The campus north of Elmwood is referred to as 'Dodge Campus', the campus south of Elmwood but north of Aksarben Village as 'Scott Campus', and the southernmost campus, home to Baxter Arena and south of Aksarben Village, as 'Center Campus'.) UNO also operates the Kaneko-UNO Library, at 12th and Jones streets in downtown Omaha.

Dodge Campus
Dodge Campus is the largest and primary campus for the University of Nebraska Omaha.  
The following colleges and their associated facilities are located on Dodge Campus:

 College of Arts and Sciences
 College of Communication, Fine Arts, and Media
 College of Education
 College of Public Affairs and Community Service
 Graduate Studies
 International Studies
 Service-Learning Academy

Additionally, Dodge Campus is also the home to the Dr. C.C. and Mabel L. Criss Library, the Strauss Performing Arts Center, the UNO Art Gallery, and the Black Box Theater.

University Village and Maverick Village student housing complexes, each composed of multiple buildings, are spread across the western edge of Dodge Campus, and additional housing is present on Scott Campus.

The H&K (Health and Kinesiology) building houses the Athletic Training Department as well as student fitness areas.  Attached is the Sapp Field House and Al F. Caniglia Field where athletics practice.  The Pep Bowl is located near Caniglia Field.

Scott Campus
Scott Campus (formerly Pacific Campus) houses the primary facilities for the College of Business Administration and the College of Information Science and Technology, which includes the Peter Kiewit Institute, the Charles W. Durham School of Architectural Engineering, and the Firefly supercomputer.  The College of Information Science and Technology houses the only National Security Agency (NSA) designated Center for Academic Excellence in Cyber Operations (CAE-CO) in the State of Nebraska. Furthermore, College of Information Science and Technology has been designated as the NSA Center for Academic Excellence in Cyber Defense (CAE-CD) since 2002 and renewed twice since then.

The Scott Technology Center incubator, which aims to assist start-up enterprises, is also located on the Scott Campus.  The Scott Data Center and Scott Conference Center are other features of Scott Campus. The campus was renamed in the Fall of 2016 to honor Walter Scott Jr.

Baxter Arena 

Baxter Arena opened south of the Scott Campus in October 2015. The arena seats 7,500 and houses men’s hockey, men’s and women’s basketball, women’s volleyball, and numerous community events. It has a main arena, and a permanent ice rink.

Athletics

The university's sports teams, branded as "Omaha", have been nicknamed the Mavericks since 1971. In 2011, 13 of the 16 sports that the university then sponsored moved from NCAA Division II to NCAA Division I and The Summit League. The exceptions were men's ice hockey, which already competed in Division I; and football and wrestling, both of which UNO dropped. Wrestling had been the school's most successful sport with national championships in 1991, 2004, 2005, 2006, 2009, 2010 and 2011.  The Omaha men's ice hockey team, the state's only Division I ice hockey program, became charter members of the National Collegiate Hockey Conference in 2011 with play beginning in the 2013–14 season, following a major conference realignment. Previously, Omaha had been in the Western Collegiate Hockey Association since 2010–11. Omaha added teams in men's golf and men's soccer in 2011.

Men's sports at UNO include tennis, baseball, basketball, soccer, golf and hockey. Women's sports include basketball, cross country, golf, soccer, softball, swimming and diving, tennis, track and volleyball. The women's softball team won the Women's College World Series national championship in 1975 as a member of the Association for Intercollegiate Athletics for Women . The women's volleyball team won the NCAA Division II women's volleyball tournament in 1996. The women's soccer team won the NCAA Division II Women's Soccer Championship in 2005.

Greek life

IFC Fraternities 
Pi Kappa Alpha 
Delta Chi

Panhellenic Sororities
Chi Omega
Alpha Xi Delta
Sigma Kappa
Zeta Tau Alpha

Media
 KVNO 90.7 FM is produced and broadcast from UNO's North Campus.  The station's format is primarily classical music, although approximately 10% of its broadcast time is devoted to athletic and campus events. MavRadio  (HD FM 90.7-2) is a student produced college/indie station also produced and broadcast from UNO's North Campus. 
The Gateway is the school's student newspaper, published bi-weekly during the spring and fall academic semesters.

Notable people

Notable alumni
Charles J. Adams, United States Air Force Brigadier General
Karrin Allyson, Grammy Award-winning American jazz vocalist
Shaq Barrett, linebacker for the Tampa Bay Buccaneers
Joshua Becker, minimalist writer
Erin Belieu, poet
Joseph Berg Esenwein (1867–1946), editor, lecturer and writer
Jason Brilz, Retired professional mixed martial artist who fought for the Ultimate Fighting Championship
Marlin Briscoe, first African American to start at quarterback in the NFL in the modern era, College Football Hall of Fame inductee 2016
Tyler Cloyd, pitcher for Cleveland Indians
Abbie Cornett, politician
Russell C. Davis, United States Air Force Lieutenant General
Merlyn Hans Dethlefsen, Medal of Honor recipient
Roger Donlon, Medal of Honor recipient
Harold Dow, CBS News correspondent and investigative reporter
Jake Ellenberger, NCAA All-American wrestler; professional Mixed Martial Artist, Welterweight in the Ultimate Fighting Championship
Dan Ellis, current goaltender for the Florida Panthers and the 60th overall pick in the 2000 NHL Entry Draft
Dick Fletcher, Emmy Award-winning television meteorologist
Peter Fonda, actor, attended Omaha University, but did not complete his degree
James W. Fous, Medal of Honor recipient, attended but enlisted in the Army and Killed in Action before completing his business degree
Laurie S. Fulton, American attorney and former United States Ambassador to Denmark
Mike Gabinet, current UNO ice hockey head coach and the 237th overall pick in the 2001 NHL Entry Draft
Jake Guentzel, forward for the Pittsburgh Penguins and 77th overall pick in the 2013 NHL Entry Draft
Chuck Hagel, former U.S. Senator and U.S. Secretary of Defense
 Paul Henderson, reporter for The Seattle Times, winner of the Pulitzer Prize for Investigative Reporting in 1982
John L. Holland, psychologist who developed The Holland Codes
David C. Jones, United States Air Force General, 9th Chairman of the Joint Chiefs of Staff
James H. Kasler, Korean War Flying ace, only person to date awarded the Air Force Cross (United States) three times
Ree Kaneko, artist
Jeff Koterba, Editorial Cartoonist, Omaha World Herald
John J. (Jack) Koraleski former Chairman and President of Union Pacific Railroad, current board member of Martin Marietta Materials, Inc.
James J. Lindsay, United States Army General
Zach Miller, current NFL tight-end for the Chicago Bears and the 180th overall pick in the 2009 NFL Draft.
Jeremy Nordquist, Nebraska State Senator
Conor Oberst of Bright Eyes attended UNO, but did not complete his degree
John L. Piotrowski, United States Air Force General, Vice Chief of Staff of the USAF
Scott Parse, former NHL wing and the 174th overall pick in the 2004 NHL Entry Draft
Penny Sackett, Astronomer, Chief Scientist of Australia
Dorothy Hayes Sater, journalist, early television reporter
Carol Schrader, Omaha news anchor and celebrity
Andrej Šustr, defenceman for the Tampa Bay Lightning
Gerald Theunissen, banker in Jennings, Louisiana, who served from 1992 to 2008 in both houses of the Louisiana State Legislature
Leo Thorsness, Medal of Honor Recipient 
Jack L. Treadwell, Medal of Honor Recipient
Vicki Trickett, actress
Leslie J. Westberg, United States Air Force Brigadier General
Colleen Williams, television reporter
Johnnie E. Wilson, United States Army General
James R. Young, former Chairman and President of Union Pacific Railroad.
Greg Zanon, defenceman for National Hockey League's Nashville Predators, Minnesota Wild, Boston Bruins, and Colorado Avalanche and the 156th overall pick in the 2000 NHL Entry Draft
Greg Zuerlein, kicker for the Los Angeles Rams
Steven K. Bonnell II, Twitch streamer and YouTube personality
Sam Curry, Cyber Security Researcher, Founder

Notable faculty
Chris W. Allen, journalism and communication professor
Jeremy Castro Baguyos, musician-researcher
Warren Buffett, investor, philanthropist
Harry Duncan, printer, author, publisher
Anna Monardo, novelist
Carey Ryan, psychologist
Ada-Rhodes Short, interdisciplinary informatics professor
Nicholas Stergiou, exercise scientist
Z. Randall Stroope, composer, conductor
Shaista Wahab, librarian, author
Mary E. Williamson, WASP, public relations, communications professor
Abdul Salam Azimi, former Chief Justice of Afghanistan
Jave Yoshimoto, artist

See also 
 Education in North Omaha, Nebraska
 The Nebraska Review
 Dr. C.C. and Mabel L. Criss Library

References

Further reading
 Oliver B. Pollak and Les Valentine, University of Nebraska at Omaha: The Campus History Series (Chicago: Arcadia Publishing, 2007).

External links

Omaha Athletics website

 
University of Nebraska Omaha
Nebraska Omaha, University of
Education in Omaha, Nebraska
Buildings and structures in Omaha, Nebraska
1908 establishments in Nebraska
Omaha